Muhammad Nasir (born 28 March 1937) is a Pakistani boxer. He competed in the men's bantamweight event at the 1960 Summer Olympics.

References

External links
 

1937 births
Living people
Pakistani male boxers
Olympic boxers of Pakistan
Boxers at the 1960 Summer Olympics
People from Pind Dadan Khan
People from Chakwal District
Asian Games medalists in boxing
Boxers at the 1958 Asian Games
Asian Games bronze medalists for Pakistan
Medalists at the 1958 Asian Games
Bantamweight boxers
20th-century Pakistani people